Porcelia is a genus of flowering plants in the family Annonaceae containing at least 19 species of which all are native to Latin America.

Species
 Porcelia macrocarpa R.E. Fr.
 Porcelia magnifructa R.E. Fr.
 Porcelia mediocris N.A. Murray
 Porcelia nitidifolia Ruiz & Pav.
 Porcelia ponderosa Rusby
 Porcelia steinbachii R.E. Fr.
 Porcelia venezuelanensis Pittier

Taxonomy
The genus was first described by Ruiz & Pav. and published in 'Florae Peruvianae, et Chilensis Prodromus 84, t. 16. 1794'.

References

Annonaceae genera
Annonaceae